Buddhism is practiced throughout Central America. Buddhism's presence in the region was primarily driven by the presence of Chinese immigrant workers during the early 19th century. Presently, Buddhism in the region is primarily of the Mahayana and Vajrayana schools, with many countries in the region having several Buddhist temples, schools, and meditation centers.

Buddhist percentage by country

References

 
 
Religion in Central America